Oyón District is one of six districts of the province Oyón in Peru.

Geography 
The Rawra mountain range and the Rumi Cruz mountain range traverse the district. Some of the highest peaks of the district are listed below:

See also 
 Chawpiqucha

References